A Grammar of Vai, alternatively known as Grammar of the Vai, is the title of the first English language grammar of the Vai language written since J.W. Koelle's Outlines of a grammar of the Vei language from 1854. The grammar was written by William E. Welmers and published in June 1977 by the University of California Press.

Bibliography
 Welmers, Wm. E. (1977) A Grammar of Vai, 

Grammar books
1977 non-fiction books
University of California Press books
English-language books
Vai language